TCDD (Turkish Republic Railways) 45171 Class is a class of 2-8-0 steam locomotives.  The class was formed when 50 USATC S160 Class were bought in 1947.

TCDD also acquired USATC S200 Class 2-8-2s which formed the 46201 Class.

Two examples are preserved: 45172 at Çamlık Railway Museum and 45174 at the TCDD Open Air Steam Locomotive Museum in Ankara.  Several examples of the base S160 class also exist in Britain and other parts of the world.

2-8-0 locomotives
45171
ALCO locomotives
Baldwin locomotives
Lima locomotives
USATC S160 Class
Standard gauge locomotives of Turkey